"Suzy Snowflake" is a song written by Sid Tepper and Roy C. Bennett, made famous by Rosemary Clooney in 1951 and released as a 78 RPM record by Columbia Records, MJV-123.

Suzy is a snowflake playfully personified. It is commonly regarded as a Christmas song, although it makes no mention of the holiday. The child-oriented lyrics celebrate the fun of winter.

A cartoon short based on the song was made in 1953 by Centaur Productions, with stop-motion animation created by Wah Ming Chang. It is annually shown during the Christmas season on WGN-TV in Chicago and WJAC-TV in Johnstown, Pennsylvania, along with another production by Centaur, Hardrock, Coco and Joe and an early UPA version of Frosty the Snowman.

Clooney later re-recorded the song for her 1978 Mistletoe Records album Christmas with Rosemary Clooney. It has been covered by other artists, most notably Soul Coughing in 1997.

See also
List of Christmas/holiday hit singles in the United States

References

External links
Suzy Snowflake at Central New York News

1951 songs
American Christmas songs
American animated short films
Christmas characters
Christmas novelty songs
Songs about weather
Songs about fictional female characters
Songs written by Roy C. Bennett
Songs written by Sid Tepper